The Quinnipiac Bobcats men's lacrosse team represents the Quinnipiac University in National Collegiate Athletic Association (NCAA) Division I college lacrosse. The program was created in 1991. Quinnipiac plays its home games at Quinnipiac Soccer and Lacrosse Field, which has a capacity of 1,500. The Bobcats currently compete in the Metro Atlantic Athletic Conference. Since 1991 the team has had an all-time record of 138–190 and reached the NCAA Division I tournament in 2016.

Season results

Career coaching records

Individual career records 

Goals

1. Mike Baglio (2002), 144

2. Joe Baglio (2002), 140

3. Alan LoGiudice (2001), 117

4. Ryan Keenan (2016), 94

5. Corey Pronsky (1997), 88

6.  John “Gia” Giordano (2001), 21

Assists

1. Michael Sagl (2015), 99

2. Joe Baglio (2002), 63

3. John Giordano (2003), 52

4. Jeff Speed (2002), 49

5. Christian Haggerty (2011), 44

Points

1. Joe Baglio (2002), 207

2. Mike Baglio (2002), 187

3. Michael Sagl (2015), 183

4. Alan LoGiudice (2001), 159

5. Ryan Keenan (2016), 131

Saves

1. T.J. Barnett (2004), 628

2. Kevin Benzing (2011), 524

3. Mike Sturmer (1998), 425

4. Jason Boggs-True (1999), 369

5. Gill Conners (2014), 366

Individual single-season records 

Goals

1. Alan LoGiudice (2001), 50

2. Joe Baglio (2001), 49

3. Mike Baglio (2001), 46

4. Joe Baglio (1999), 41

5. Mike Baglio (2002), 40

Assists

1. Michael Sagl (2015), 31

2. Joe Baglio (2001), 29

3. Michael Sagl (2014), 26

4. Michael Sagl (2013), 25

4. Christian Haggerty (2010), 25

4. Brian Perry (1998), 25

Points

1. Joe Baglio (2001), 78

2. Alan LoGiudice (2001), 64

3. Mike Baglio (2001), 60

4. Brian Perry (1998), 58

5. Michael Sagl (2015), 56

Saves

1. Mike Sturmer (1999), 252

2. T.J. Barnett (2001), 205

3. Gill Conners (2013), 195

4. Mike Sturmer (1998), 173

5. Gill Conners (2014), 171

Individual single-game records 

Goals Scored
Erik Anderson at Siena (4/10/99), 8

Assists
John Giordano at Wagner (4/1/00), 7

Points
Alan LoGuidice vs. Manhattan (4/27/99), 10

Saves
Mike Sturmer vs. Gannon (3/6/99), 32

Team single-season records 
Goals Scored
170 (1998)

Goals Allowed
190 (1994)

Fewest Goals Scored
45 (1991)

Fewest Goals Allowed
94 (1991)

Wins
14 (2001)

Loses
11 (2004, 2005, 2012)

Team single-game records 

Goals Scored
27 at Wagner (4/1/00)

Goals Allowed
25 vs. Kean (4/12/94)

Fewest Goals Scored
1 vs. Bentley (3/25/97)

Fewest Goals Allowed
0 vs. New Haven (4/27/98)

Margin Of Victory
(24–0) vs. New Haven (4/27/98)

Margin Of Defeat
(23–2) at Queens (4/30/94)

References

External links 
Official website
All-time records through 2015
Laxpower

Lacrosse, Men's
Lacrosse clubs established in 1991
1991 establishments in Connecticut